The Generation of Danger  is the second studio album by American nu metal band Tallah. It was preceded by five singles: "Telescope", "The Impressionist", "Shaken (Not Stirred)", "For the Recognition", and "Dicker's Done".

Release
On March 9, 2022, they released the single and music video "Telescope", and announced the title of the album, The Generation of Danger, along with the original release date of September 9, 2022. The band supported All That Remains on their spring 2022 US tour that began on March 12, 2022, in Worcester, Massachusetts. On April 19, 2022, they released the second single off the album, "The Impressionist" with a music video. In August 2022, they announced that the album's release would be pushed back to November 18. On September 1, 2022, they released "Shaken (Not Stirred)" as a single with a music video. On October 13, 2022, they released the single "For the Recognition" with a music video. On November 10, 2022, they released the fifth and final single "Dicker's Done". The album was released on November 18, 2022.

Composition  
The Generation of Danger has been described as nu metal, metalcore, hardcore punk, and deathcore. According to Max Morin of Metal Injection, vocalist Justin Bonitz's goes from "jibbering like a maniac, spitting rap bars, shredding his throat with pig squeals or finding his inner arena rock frontman, he might be the most unpredictable member of the band." Metal Injection also noted influences from bands like Code Orange and Knocked Loose. According to Eli Enis of Revolver, The Generation of Danger is a "sci-fi [concept album] about a crazed genius, featuring nine different characters that [vocalist Justin Bonitz] portrays with a variety of unique vocals."

Reception 

Max Morin of Metal Injection wrote "Any fan of the last twenty years of metal should find something to like about The Generation of Danger. Tallah is about as subtle as a bunch of cavemen beating a drum kit with rocks, but they're so dedicated to the chaos that it's admirable." Simon Valentine of Wall of Sound called it "a frenetic album that both salutes the old guard but offers up their signature sound as the new normal."

Track listing

Personnel 
Tallah
 Justin Bonitz – vocals
 Derrick Schneider – lead guitar, backing vocals 
 Alizé "Mewzen" Rodriguez – turntables, samples, keyboards 
 Alex Snowden – rhythm guitar 
 Max Portnoy – drums, percussion  

Additional personnel
 Josh Schroeder – production

References

2022 albums
Earache Records albums